The Piano Concerto No. 1 is a composition for solo piano and orchestra by the American composer Peter Lieberson.  The work was commissioned by the Boston Symphony Orchestra for its centennial.  Lieberson started composing the piece in 1980 and completed it on March 2, 1983.  It was written for the pianist Peter Serkin, who first performed the concerto with the Boston Symphony Orchestra under the direction of Seiji Ozawa on April 21, 1983.  The piece is dedicated to Peter Serkin and Seiji Ozawa.  It was a finalist for the 1984 Pulitzer Prize for Music.

Composition
The piano concerto has a duration of roughly 45 minutes and is composed in three numbered movements.  The composition blends traditional and western musical techniques with Buddhist themes.

Instrumentation
The work is scored for a solo piano and a large orchestra consisting of three flutes (2nd and 3rd doubling piccolo), two oboes, English horn, two clarinets, bass clarinet (doubling contrabass clarinet), two bassoons, contrabassoon, four horns, three trumpets, two trombones, bass trombone, tuba, six percussionists, celesta, harp, and strings.

Reception
Reviewing the world premiere, Paul Driver of The Boston Globe described the work as "an astonishing synthesis of romantic and modern" and wrote, "Lieberson has learned how to charge his music with a potent internal magnetism; the notes seem to be attracted to each other in the old classical sense; there is real harmonic depth. Which is another way of saying that his concerto surges with creative energy."

Arnold Whittall of Gramophone was more critical of the work, however, remarking, "The biggest thing about the Concerto is its Buddhist subtext, since the three movements apparently reflect an interpretation of the Buddhist apprehension of earth, man and heaven. Those qualified to judge may believe that the music's inspiration matches this grand design. On a more mundane level, however, I can't feel that the music's inspiration matches either its length or its density."  He added:

References

Compositions by Peter Lieberson
1983 compositions
Lieberson 1
Music commissioned by the Boston Symphony Orchestra